The Harvey Butler Memorial Rhododendron Sanctuary 30 acres (121,000 m2) is a nature reserve located on Route 11A, Springvale, Maine, United States. The sanctuary is open to the public, and is owned by the New England Wild Flower Society, which also maintains the Garden in the Woods.

The sanctuary contains a 5.3 acre (21,000 m2) stand of Great Laurel (Rhododendron maximum), Spice Bush, Clintonia, Painted trillium, and at least 39 species of wildflowers.

See also
 List of botanical gardens in the United States

References

Botanical gardens in Maine
Nature reserves in Maine
Protected areas of York County, Maine